The 1929 municipal election was held December 9, 1929 to elect a mayor and five aldermen to sit on Edmonton City Council and four trustees to sit on the public school board, while four trustees were acclaimed to the separate school board).  In the election's only plebiscite, voters didn't endorse the extension of the half day Wednesday shopping holiday by the required two-thirds majority.

There were ten aldermen on city council, but five of the positions were already filled: James Collisson, Alfred Farmilo, James Findlay, Charles Gibbs, and Frederick Keillor (SS) were all elected to two-year terms in 1928 and were still in office.

There were seven trustees on the public school board, but four of the positions were already filled: Samuel Barnes, Thyrza Bishop, and Frederick Casselman had all been elected to two-year terms in 1928 and were still in office.  The same was true on the separate board, where Robert Adrien Crowe (SS), J O Pilon, and W B Trainor were continuing.

Electoral system
The mayor was elected through First-past-the-post voting. First past the post does not require that the successful candidate takes a majority of the votes (first preference votes by themselves or them and votes later transferred from others) but in this election the successful candidate did in fact receive a majority of the votes cast.

The aldermanic race, where five seats were being filled, was conducted using Plurality block voting and each voter could cast up to five votes. The successful candidates received a total of approximately 39,000 votes of the 76,000 voters cast by the 41,000 voters. Their vote tally might have been cast by less than 8,000 of the 41,000 voters who cast a ballot in this election.

Voter turnout

There were 18,549 ballots cast out of 40,993 eligible voters, for a voter turnout of 45.2%.

A total of about 76,000 votes were cast in the aldermanic race due to the use of Plurality block voting.

Results

 bold or  indicates elected
 italics indicate incumbent
 "SS", where data is available, indicates representative for Edmonton's South Side, with a minimum South Side representation instituted after the city of Strathcona, south of the North Saskatchewan River, amalgamated into Edmonton on February 1, 1912.

Mayor

Aldermen

Public school trustees

Separate (Catholic) school trustees

Charles Gariepy, Thomas Magee, A J Ryan and J Tansey (SS) were acclaimed to the separate school board.

Wednesday Holiday Plebiscite

 Plebiscite items required a minimum two-thirds "Yes" majority to bring about action

In favour of having Wednesday half-holiday extended to cover all the year except the month of December?

Yes - 1,097
No - 654

References

Election History, City of Edmonton: Elections and Census Office

1929
1929 elections in Canada
1929 in Alberta